Thomas J. Monaghan (July 26, 1914 – August 2, 1992) was an American politician. He served as the mayor of Lancaster, Pennsylvania twice, once from 1958 to 1962 and again from 1966 to 1974. Monoaghan later served as secretary of commerce for Pennsylvania. He was then indicted on corruption charges in 1975.

References

Mayors of Lancaster, Pennsylvania
1914 births
1992 deaths
20th-century American politicians